Saadeddin Mohammed Amin Arkej, is an Iraqi Turkmen politician and the honorary leader of the Iraqi Turkmen Front (ITF) political party. Arkej was elected chairman of the Iraqi Turkmen Front in June 2005. In December 2005, he was elected as the sole member of the Iraqi Council of Representatives (CoR) on the ITF list.

See also
Government of the Islamic Republic of Iran

References

Living people
Members of the Council of Representatives of Iraq
Iraqi Turkmen Front politicians
People from Kirkuk
Iraqi Turkmen people
1948 births